Ken Rowlands (3 July 1927 – 14 August 2011) was a Welsh light heavyweight boxer. Born in Maerdy in the Rhondda Valley but fighting out of Luton in England, Rowland's professional career spanned from 1948 to 1958. He first won the Welsh light heavyweight title in 1953, but after losing the title, retook it again in 1955.

References

External links
 

1927 births
2011 deaths
Welsh male boxers
Light-heavyweight boxers
People from Rhondda